A cistern is a water storage tank.

Cistern may also refer to:

 Subarachnoid cisterns, openings in the subarachnoid space of the brain
 Cisterna a flattened disc in the Golgi apparatus and endoplasmic reticulum
 Cistern, Texas, a village in Texas
 Cistern (album), a 2016 album by Jherek Bischoff
 Maitland Monument, Corfu, which is known locally as the Cistern (Στέρνα)
 Cistern, a water reservoir at Buffalo Bayou Park 
 "The Cistern", a short story by Ray Bradbury
 The Cisterns, Cisternerne, a museum and water reservoir in Copenhagen

See also
 Cistern Field, an airport in Cistern Cay, the Bahamas
 Syston, a civil parish in Leicestershire, England
 Cisterna (disambiguation) 
 La Cisterna, Chile
 List of Roman cisterns
 Sistan, an area split between east Iran and west Afghanistan
 Sistine Chapel
 Cittern